Vlad Lupan (born 26 July 1971, Chişinău) is the former Ambassador, Permanent Representative of the Republic of Moldova to the United Nations. Between 2010-2011 he was a Member of the Parliament of the Republic of Moldova, Deputy Chairman of the Liberal Party. He is a former diplomat from the Republic of Moldova. He has been the Foreign Policy Advisor to the President of Moldova since August 2010. Vlad Lupan served for 12 years in the diplomatic service of his country and in his last posting he was the director of the NATO Department in the Ministry of the Foreign Affairs and European Integration of Moldova. Since 2008 he was a civil society expert on EU, NATO, security sector reform issues, as well as an external efficiency evaluator and, at the same time, had his show on Vocea Basarabiei radio station.

Biography
Vlad Lupan was born in 1971 in Chişinău and graduated from Moldova State University (1993) and National School of Administration and Political Science of Bucharest. As of 2008 he holds a Master of Arts degree in Journalism and Public Communication from the Free Independent University of Moldova. He worked for the Ministry of the Foreign Affairs and European Integration of Moldova as of September 1996 until 2008, and starting with 2012 he continues diplomatic activity as the Ambassador of Moldova to UN. He is a former Moderator of the "Euro-Atlantic Dictionary" talkshow, on Radio Vocea Basarabiei and ex-Member of the Advisory Board to the Ministry of Defense (Moldova). Previously a coordinator of the Civil Society "Report of the 19" experts on Moldova-EU, he wrote studies on EU-Moldova and also on Foreign and Domestic policies. During his work with the Ministry of Foreign Affairs he was seconded to two State Commission as a negotiator of the Transnistria conflict settlement (Joint Control Commission of the Security Zone and the Commission on political negotiations of the Transnistria conflict) and also to three Organization for Security and Co-operation in Europe field Missions (Georgia/South Ossetia - Albania, Croatia). His last position with the MFA, before assuming the post of the Ambassador to UN, was in 2008, as Director of the NATO Department in the Ministry of Foreign Affairs. In August 2010, Vlad Lupan replaced Mihai Bălan (appointed ambassador to Greece) as Foreign Policy Advisor to the President of Moldova. Before being appointed to his posting as the Ambassador of the Republic of Moldova to UN, he served as an MP (Liberal) in the Parliament of the Republic of Moldova.

Awards
 Premiul pentru patriotism, competenţă şi spirit non-conformist în afirmarea intereselor naţionale ale Republicii Moldova

References

External links 
 NEW PERMANENT REPRESENTATIVE OF REPUBLIC OF MOLDOVA PRESENTS CREDENTIALS
 Secretary-General Meets Permanent Representative of Moldova
 Vlad Lupan - noul consilier prezidențial pentru politică externă 
 Vlad Lupan: "Să schimbăm concepţia de securitate elaborată de dragul Federaţiei Ruse"
 Vlad Lupan

1971 births
Living people
Diplomats from Chișinău
Moldova State University alumni
Permanent Representatives of Moldova to the United Nations
Ambassadors of Moldova to Greece
Moldovan journalists
Male journalists
Members of the parliament of Moldova
Moldovan activists
Romanian people of Moldovan descent
Euronova Media Group
National University of Political Studies and Public Administration alumni